Aeverrillia is a genus of bryozoans belonging to the order Ctenostomatida. It is the only genus in the monotypic family Aeverrilliidae.

References

Ctenostomatida
Bryozoan genera